Lysimachia ciliata, the fringed loosestrife, is a species of flowering plant in the family Primulaceae. The star-shaped yellow flowers are borne in midsummer. It is native to North America, including most of southern Canada and most of the United States except for the southwest. This plant is notable in that it is one of the few species of Lysimachia to bear elaiophores, that is, to offer oil instead of nectar as a reward to pollinators. It is pollinated in the northern part of its range by the specialist oil bee Macropis nuda, a native bee species whose survival depends upon this host plant.

It is also cultivated as an ornamental plant. It can be aggressive, but new suckers can be removed easily to keep plant size under control. The most common cultivars of L. ciliata include: 
 L. ciliata 'Firecracker'
 L. ciliata 'Purpurea'

'Firecracker' has gained the Royal Horticultural Society's Award of Garden Merit.

References

External links

USDA Plants Profile forLysimachia ciliata (fringed loosestrife)
Lysimachia ciliata — U.C. Photo gallery

ciliata
Flora of Canada
Flora of the Eastern United States
Flora of the Western United States
Flora of Alaska
Plants described in 1753
Taxa named by Carl Linnaeus
Flora without expected TNC conservation status